Hot & Wet is the fourth studio album by American R&B group 112. It was released by Bad Boy Records and Def Soul on December 9, 2003 in the United States. The album followed the successful Part III album, with the club tracks "Na Na Na Na" and "Hot & Wet" which was produced by Stevie J. It was also their first album not exclusively associated with Bad Boy, signaling the groups' eventual departure from the label in 2004.

Background
In 2002 the group members, having matured both personally and professionally, came to the realization that a split with the Bad Boy label was necessary due to the lack of interest. In search of greater creative control, 112 left Bad Boy Records in February 2002 and signed with Def Jam in July on their Def Soul-imprint, insisting that the breakup was amicable. They reiterated this "no-hard-feelings" attitude by going to Daddy's House to record a debut album for Def Jam. Disagreements remained over ownership rights to the 112 catalog of songs, and this album - the Def Jam debut disc was waylaid as a result, while negotiations ensued between Lyor Cohen of Def Jam and Bad Boy owner Combs. With both sides ultimately in agreement, Hot & Wet would eventually appear in November 2003.

Release and promotion

Singles
 The first single, "Na Na Na Na" was released on July 22, 2003 and features dance hall legend, Super Cat.
 The second single, "Hot & Wet" was released on September 22, 2003 and features rapper, Ludacris.
 The third single, "Right Here for U" charted at number 74 on the R&B chart on January 2, 2004. The song was released as a digital download only.
 The fourth and last single, Give It to Me" was released on April 13, 2004.

Critical reception

AllMusic editor Andy Kellman found that Hot & Wet offered "the same mixed bag of strong singles and inconsistent album cuts that fans have grown accustomed to since the 1996 debut [...] The overabundance of slow-tempo material weighs down the listen, which is especially problematic since the album is nearly 70 minutes in duration." Jon Caramanica from Rolling Stone wrote that most of the "album moves at a snail's pace, though – an undifferentiated set of slooowww jams that suggest 112 are asleep at the wheel."

Commercial performance
Hot & Wet peaked at number 22 on the US Billboard 200, while also reaching number four on the Top R&B/Hip-Hop Albums chart.

Track listing

Personnel

 Chris Athens — mastering
 Leesa Brunson — A&R assistance
 Jonathan "Chronic Face" Burke — vocal engineer
 Isaac Carree — vocals
 Dru Castro — engineer
 Da Twelve — executive producer
 Tina Davis — A&R
 Vidal Davis — producer
 Dent — multi instruments, producer
 Stephen Dent — producer, engineer, instrumentation
 Diddy — producer, executive producer
 Emery Dobyns — engineer
 Steve Fisher — assistant
 Marcus T. Grant — executive producer
 Andre Harris — producer
 Stevie J. — producer, overdubs, compilation
 Jahaun Johnson — A&R
 Daron Jones — multi instruments, producer, instrumentation
 Jonathan Jordan — engineer
 Victoria Jordan — art direction
 Terese Joseph — recording director
 Jonathan Kaslow — A&R, artist coordination
 Rich Keller — engineer, mixing
 Daniel Levitt — photography
 Paul Logus — engineer, mixing
 Carlton Lynn — engineer
 Manny Marroquin — mixing, vocal mixing
 Vernon Mungo — engineer, mixing
 Rob Paustian — engineer, mixing
 Tara Podolsky — A&R
 Saint Denson — producer
 Keith Slattery — engineer
 Spi — multi instruments, producer, instrumentation
 Brian Stanley — engineer
 Christopher Stern — creative director
 Rabeka Tuinei — assistant
 Kevin Wales — producer
 Eric Weissman — sample clearance

Charts

Weekly charts

Year-end charts

Release history

References

2003 albums
112 (band) albums
Bad Boy Records albums
Def Jam Recordings albums